is a Quasi-National Park on the coast of Fukui and Ishikawa Prefectures, Japan. The park was established in 1968. It is rated a protected landscape (category Ib) according to the IUCN. 
Like all Quasi-National Parks in Japan, Echizen-Kaga Kaigan Quasi-National Park is managed by the local prefectural governments.

Sites of interest
The park consists of several discontinuous locations, which include:

Related municipalities
 Fukui: Awara, Echizen, Fukui, Minamiechizen, Sakai, Tsuruga
 Ishikawa: Kaga

See also

 National Parks of Japan

References
Southerland, Mary and Britton, Dorothy. The National Parks of Japan. Kodansha International (1995). 

National parks of Japan
Parks and gardens in Fukui Prefecture
Parks and gardens in Ishikawa Prefecture
Protected areas established in 1968
1968 establishments in Japan